Former Vanderburgh County Sheriff's Residence is a historic jail and sheriff's residence located in downtown Evansville, Indiana. It was built in 1891, and is a -story, rusticated limestone building modeled after Schloss Lichtenstein. It features a central round tower or "keep", stepped gables, crenellated roofline, and turrets.

It was added to the National Register of Historic Places in 1970.

References

Evansville
Government buildings completed in 1891
Buildings and structures in Evansville, Indiana
National Register of Historic Places in Evansville, Indiana